Capiago Intimiano is a comune (municipality) in the Province of Como in the Italian region Lombardy, located about  north of Milan and about  southeast of Como.

Capiago observes the Roman Rite while Intimiano observes the Ambrosian Rite.

The municipality of Capiago Intimiano contains the frazioni (subdivisions, mainly villages and hamlets) of Olmeda.

Capiago Intimiano borders the following municipalities: Cantù, Como, Lipomo, Montorfano, Orsenigo, Senna Comasco.

Demographic evolution

Twin towns — sister cities
Capiago Intimiano is twinned with:

  Buják, Hungary

References

Cities and towns in Lombardy